An air quality index (AQI) is used by government agencies to communicate to the public how polluted the air currently is or how polluted it is forecast to become. AQI information is obtained by averaging readings from an air quality sensor, which can increase due to vehicle traffic, forest fires, or anything that can increase air pollution. Pollutants tested include ozone, nitrogen dioxide, sulphur dioxide, among others.

Public health risks increase as the AQI rises, especially affecting children, the elderly, and individuals with respiratory or cardiovascular issues. During these times, governmental bodies generally encourage people to reduce physical activity outdoors, or even avoid going out altogether. The use of face masks such as cloth masks may also be recommended.

Different countries have their own air quality indices, corresponding to different national air quality standards. Some of these are Canada's Air Quality Health Index, Malaysia's Air Pollution Index, and Singapore's Pollutant Standards Index.

Overview

Computation of the AQI requires an air pollutant concentration over a specified averaging period, obtained from an air monitor or model. Taken together, concentration and time represent the dose of the air pollutant. Health effects corresponding to a given dose are established by epidemiological research. Air pollutants vary in potency, and the function used to convert from air pollutant concentration to AQI varies by pollutant. Its air quality index values are typically grouped into ranges. Each range is assigned a descriptor, a color code, and a standardized public health advisory.

The AQI can increase due to an increase of air emissions. For example, during rush hour traffic or when there is an upwind forest fire or from a lack of dilution of air pollutants. Stagnant air, often caused by an anticyclone, temperature inversion, or low wind speeds lets air pollution remain in a local area, leading to high concentrations of pollutants, chemical reactions between air contaminants and hazy conditions.

On a day when the AQI is predicted to be elevated due to fine particle pollution, an agency or public health organization might:
 advise sensitive groups, such as the elderly, children, and those with respiratory or cardiovascular problems, to avoid outdoor exertion.
 declare an "action day" to encourage voluntary measures to reduce air emissions, such as using public transportation.
 recommend the use of masks to keep fine particles from entering the lungs

During a period of very poor air quality, such as an air pollution episode, when the AQI indicates that acute exposure may cause significant harm to the public health, agencies may invoke emergency plans that allow them to order major emitters (such as coal burning industries) to curtail emissions until the hazardous conditions abate.

Most air contaminants do not have an associated AQI. Many countries monitor ground-level ozone, particulates, sulfur dioxide, carbon monoxide and nitrogen dioxide, and calculate air quality indices for these pollutants.

The definition of the AQI in a particular nation reflects the discourse surrounding the development of national air quality standards in that nation.  A website allowing government agencies anywhere in the world to submit their real-time air monitoring data for display using a common definition of the air quality index has recently become available.

Indices by location

Australia 
Each of the states and territories of Australia is responsible for monitoring air quality and publishing data in accordance with the National Environment Protection (Ambient Air Quality) Measure (NEPM) standards.

Each state and territory publishes air quality data for individual monitoring locations, and most states and territories publish air quality indexes for each monitoring location.

Across Australia, a consistent approach is taken with air quality indexes, using a simple linear scale where 100 represents the maximum concentration standard for each pollutant, as set by the NEPM. These maximum concentration standards are:

The air quality index (AQI) for an individual location is simply the highest of the air quality index values for each pollutant being monitored at that location.

AQI bands, with health advice for each:

Canada

Air quality in Canada has been reported for many years with provincial Air Quality Indices (AQIs). Significantly, AQI values reflect air quality management objectives, which are based on the lowest achievable emissions rate, rather than exclusive concern for human health. The Air Quality Health Index (AQHI) is a scale designed to help understand the impact of air quality on health. It is a health protection tool used to make decisions to reduce short-term exposure to air pollution by adjusting activity levels during increased levels of air pollution. The Air Quality Health Index also provides advice on how to improve air quality by proposing a behavioral change to reduce the environmental footprint. This index pays particular attention to people who are sensitive to air pollution. It provides them with advice on how to protect their health during air quality levels associated with low, moderate, high and very high health risks.

The AQHI provides a number from 1 to 10+ to indicate the level of health risk associated with local air quality. On occasion, when the amount of air pollution is abnormally high, the number may exceed 10. The AQHI provides a local air quality current value as well as a local air quality maximums forecast for today, tonight, and tomorrow, and provides associated health advice.

China

Hong Kong 
On December 30, 2013, Hong Kong replaced the Air Pollution Index with a new index called the Air Quality Health Index. This index, reported by the Environmental Protection Department, is measured on a scale of 1 to 10+ and considers four air pollutants: ozone; nitrogen dioxide; sulphur dioxide and particulate matter (including PM10 and PM2.5). For any given hour the AQHI is calculated from the sum of the percentage excess risk of daily hospital admissions attributable to the 3-hour moving average concentrations of these four pollutants. The AQHIs are grouped into five AQHI health risk categories with health advice provided:

Each of the health risk categories has advice associated with it. At the low and moderate levels the public are advised that they can continue normal activities. For the high category, children, the elderly and people with heart or respiratory illnesses are advised to reduce outdoor physical exertion.  Above this (very high or serious), the general public are likewise advised to reduce or avoid outdoor physical exertion.

Mainland China 
China's Ministry of Environmental Protection (MEP) is responsible for measuring the level of air pollution in China. As of January 1, 2013, MEP monitors daily pollution level in 163 of its major cities. The AQI level is based on the level of six atmospheric pollutants, namely sulfur dioxide (SO2), nitrogen dioxide (NO2), suspended particulates smaller than 10 μm in aerodynamic diameter (PM10), suspended particulates smaller than 2.5 μm in aerodynamic diameter (PM2.5), carbon monoxide (CO), and ozone (O3) measured at the monitoring stations throughout each city.

AQI mechanics

An individual score (Individual Air Quality Index, IAQI) is calculated using breakpoint concentrations below, and using same piecewise linear function to calculate intermediate values as the US AQI scale. and The final AQI value can be calculated either per hour or per 24 hours and is the max of these six scores.

The score for each pollutant is non-linear, as is the final AQI score. Thus an AQI of 300 does not mean twice the pollution of AQI at 150, nor does it mean the air is twice as harmful. The concentration of a pollutant when its IAQI is 100 does not equal twice its concentration when its IAQI is 50, nor does it mean the pollutant is twice as harmful. While an AQI of 50 from day 1 to 182 and AQI of 100 from day 183 to 365 does provide an annual average of 75, it does not mean the pollution is acceptable even if the benchmark of 100 is deemed safe. Because the benchmark is a 24-hour target, and the annual average must match the annual target, it is entirely possible to have safe air every day of the year but still fail the annual pollution benchmark.

Europe
The Common Air Quality Index (CAQI) is an air quality index used in Europe since 2006. In November 2017, the European Environment Agency announced the European Air Quality Index (EAQI) and started encouraging its use on websites and for other ways of informing the public about air quality.

CAQI
, the EU-supported project CiteairII argued that the CAQI had been evaluated on a "large set" of data, and described the CAQI's motivation and definition. CiteairII stated that having an air quality index that would be easy to present to the general public was a major motivation, leaving aside the more complex question of a health-based index, which would require, for example, effects of combined levels of different pollutants. The main aim of the CAQI was to have an index that would encourage wide comparison across the EU, without replacing local indices. CiteairII stated that the "main goal of the CAQI is not to warn people for possible adverse health effects of poor air quality but to attract their attention to urban air pollution and its main source (traffic) and help them decrease their exposure."

The CAQI is a number on a scale from 1 to 100, where a low value means good air quality and a high value means bad air quality. The index is defined in both hourly and daily versions, and separately near roads (a "roadside" or "traffic" index) or away from roads (a "background" index). , the CAQI had two mandatory components for the roadside index, NO2 and PM10, and three mandatory components for the background index, NO2, PM10 and O3. It also included optional pollutants PM2.5, CO and SO2. A "sub-index" is calculated for each of the mandatory (and optional if available) components. The CAQI is defined as the sub-index that represents the worst quality among those components.

Some of the key pollutant concentrations in μg/m3 for the hourly background index, the corresponding sub-indices, and five CAQI ranges and verbal descriptions are as follows.

Frequently updated CAQI values and maps are shown on www.airqualitynow.eu and other websites. A separate Year Average Common Air Quality Index (YACAQI) is also defined, in which different pollutant sub-indices are separately normalised to a value typically near unity. For example, the yearly averages of NO2, PM10 and PM2.5 are divided by 40 μg/m3, 40 μg/m3 and 20 μg/m3, respectively. The overall background or traffic YACAQI for a city is the arithmetic mean of a defined subset of these sub-indices.

India
The National Air Quality Index (AQI) was launched in New Delhi on September 17, 2014, under the Swachh Bharat Abhiyan.

The Central Pollution Control Board along with State Pollution Control Boards has been operating National Air Monitoring Program (NAMP) covering 240 cities of the country having more than 342 monitoring stations. An Expert Group comprising medical professionals, air quality experts, academia, advocacy groups, and SPCBs was constituted and a technical study was awarded to IIT Kanpur. IIT Kanpur and the Expert Group recommended an AQI scheme in 2014. While the earlier measuring index was limited to three indicators, the new index measures eight parameters. The continuous monitoring systems that provide data on near real-time basis are installed in New Delhi, Mumbai, Pune, Kolkata and Ahmedabad.

There are six AQI categories, namely Good, Satisfactory, Moderate, Poor, Severe, and Hazardous. The proposed AQI will consider eight pollutants (PM, PM, NO, SO, CO, O, NH, and Pb) for which short-term (up to 24-hourly averaging period) National Ambient Air Quality Standards are prescribed. Based on the measured ambient concentrations, corresponding standards and likely health impact, a sub-index is calculated for each of these pollutants. The worst sub-index reflects overall AQI. Likely health impacts for different AQI categories and pollutants have also been suggested, with primary inputs from the medical experts in the group. The AQI values and corresponding ambient concentrations (health breakpoints) as well as associated likely health impacts for the identified eight pollutants are as follows:

Japan
According to Japan Weather Association, Japan uses a different scale to measure the air quality index.

Mexico

The air quality in Mexico City is reported in IMECAs. The IMECA is calculated using the measurements of average times of the chemicals ozone (O3), sulphur dioxide (SO2), nitrogen dioxide (NO2), carbon monoxide (CO), particles smaller than 2.5 micrometers (PM2.5), and particles smaller than 10 micrometers (PM10).

Singapore
Singapore uses the Pollutant Standards Index to report on its air quality, with details of the calculation similar but not identical to those used in Malaysia and Hong Kong.
The PSI chart below is grouped by index values and descriptors, according to the National Environment Agency.

South Korea
The Ministry of Environment of South Korea uses the Comprehensive Air-quality Index (CAI) to describe the ambient air quality based on the health risks of air pollution. The index aims to help the public easily understand the air quality and protect people's health. The CAI is on a scale from 0 to 500, which is divided into six categories. The higher the CAI value, the greater the level of air pollution.
Of values of the five air pollutants, the highest is the CAI value. The index also has associated health effects and a colour representation of the categories as shown below.

The N Seoul Tower on Namsan Mountain in central Seoul, South Korea, is illuminated in blue, from sunset to 23:00 and 22:00 in winter, on days where the air quality in Seoul is 45 or less. During the spring of 2012, the Tower was lit up for 52 days, which is four days more than in 2011.

United Kingdom
The most commonly used air quality index in the UK is the Daily Air Quality Index recommended by the Committee on the Medical Effects of Air Pollutants (COMEAP). This index has ten points, which are further grouped into four bands: low, moderate, high and very high. Each of the bands comes with advice for at-risk groups and the general population.

The index is based on the concentrations of five pollutants. The index is calculated from the concentrations of the following pollutants:  Ozone, Nitrogen Dioxide, Sulphur Dioxide, PM2.5 (particles with an aerodynamic diameter less than 2.5 μm) and PM10.  The breakpoints between index values are defined for each pollutant separately and the overall index is defined as the maximum value of the index. Different averaging periods are used for different pollutants.

United States

The United States Environmental Protection Agency (EPA) has developed an Air Quality Index that is used to report air quality. This AQI is divided into six categories indicating increasing levels of health concern. An AQI value over 300 represents hazardous air quality and below 50 the air quality is good.

The AQI is based on the five "criteria" pollutants regulated under the Clean Air Act: ground-level ozone, particulate matter, carbon monoxide, sulfur dioxide, and nitrogen dioxide.  The EPA has established National Ambient Air Quality Standards (NAAQS) for each of these pollutants in order to protect public health. An AQI value of 100 generally corresponds to the level of the NAAQS for the pollutant. The Clean Air Act (USA) (1990) requires the EPA to review its National Ambient Air Quality Standards every five years to reflect evolving health effects information. The Air Quality Index is adjusted periodically to reflect these changes.

Computing the AQI
The air quality index is a piecewise linear function of the pollutant concentration. At the boundary between AQI categories, there is a discontinuous jump of one AQI unit. To convert from concentration to AQI this equation is used:

(If multiple pollutants are measured, the calculated AQI is the highest value calculated from the above equation applied for each pollutant.)

where:

 =  the (Air Quality) index,
 =  the pollutant concentration,
=  the concentration breakpoint that is ≤ ,
=  the concentration breakpoint that is ≥ ,

The EPA's table of breakpoints is:

Suppose a monitor records a 24-hour average fine particle (PM2.5) concentration of 26.4 micrograms per cubic meter. The equation above results in an AQI of:

which rounds to index value of 81, corresponding to air quality in the "Moderate" range. To convert an air pollutant concentration to an AQI, EPA has developed a calculator.

If multiple pollutants are measured at a monitoring site, then the largest or "dominant" AQI value is reported for the location. The ozone AQI between 100 and 300 is computed by selecting the larger of the AQI calculated with a 1-hour ozone value and the AQI computed with the 8-hour ozone value.

Eight-hour ozone averages do not define AQI values greater than 300; AQI values of 301 or greater are calculated with 1-hour ozone concentrations. 1-hour SO2 values do not define higher AQI values greater than 200. AQI values of 201 or greater are calculated with 24-hour SO2 concentrations.

Real-time monitoring data from continuous monitors are typically available as 1-hour averages. However, computation of the AQI for some pollutants requires averaging over multiple hours of data.  (For example, calculation of the ozone AQI requires computation of an 8-hour average and computation of the PM2.5 or PM10 AQI requires a 24-hour average.) To accurately reflect the current air quality, the multi-hour average used for the AQI computation should be centered on the current time, but as concentrations of future hours are unknown and are difficult to estimate accurately, EPA uses surrogate concentrations to estimate these multi-hour averages. For reporting the PM2.5, PM10 and ozone air quality indices, this surrogate concentration is called the NowCast. The Nowcast is a particular type of weighted average that provides more weight to the most recent air quality data when air pollution levels are changing. There is a free email subscription service for New York inhabitants – AirNYC. Subscribers get notifications about the changes in the AQI values for the selected location (e.g. home address), based on air quality conditions.

Public availability of the AQI

Real time monitoring data and forecasts of air quality that are color-coded in terms of the air quality index are available from EPA's AirNow web site. Other organizations provide monitoring for members of sensitive groups such as asthmatics, children and adults over the age of 65. Historical air monitoring data including AQI charts and maps are available at EPA's AirData website. Detailed map about current AQI level and its two-day forecast is available from Aerostate web site.

History of the AQI
The AQI made its debut in 1968, when the National Air Pollution Control Administration undertook an initiative to develop an air quality index and to apply the methodology to Metropolitan Statistical Areas. The impetus was to draw public attention to the issue of air pollution and indirectly push responsible local public officials to take action to control sources of pollution and enhance air quality within their jurisdictions.

Jack Fensterstock, the head of the National Inventory of Air Pollution Emissions and Control Branch, was tasked to lead the development of the methodology and to compile the air quality and emissions data necessary to test and calibrate resultant indices.

The initial iteration of the air quality index used standardized ambient pollutant concentrations to yield individual pollutant indices.  These indices were then weighted and summed to form a single total air quality index. The overall methodology could use concentrations that are taken from ambient monitoring data or are predicted by means of a diffusion model. The concentrations were then converted into a standard statistical distribution with a preset mean and standard deviation. The resultant individual pollutant indices are assumed to be equally weighted, although values other than unity can be used. Likewise, the index can incorporate any number of pollutants although it was only used to combine SOx, CO, and TSP because of a lack of available data for other pollutants.

While the methodology was designed to be robust, the practical application for all metropolitan areas proved to be inconsistent due to the paucity of ambient air quality monitoring data, lack of agreement on weighting factors, and non-uniformity of air quality standards across geographical and political boundaries. Despite these issues, the publication of lists ranking metropolitan areas achieved the public policy objectives and led to the future development of improved indices and their routine application.

Vietnam 
On November 12, 2019, Vietnam Environment Administration issued Decision No. 1459/QD-TCMT on promulgating Technical Guidelines for calculation and publication of Vietnam Air Quality Index (VN_AQI).

See also

 Air pollution
 Air pollution measurement
 Indoor air quality
 Air pollution forecasting

References

External links
Some of the following websites display actively updated air quality index maps; others are archived versions of inactive websites:
 Global:
 Worldwide Air Pollution: Real-time Air Quality Index Visual Map
 Europe:
 CAQI- AirqualityNow
 EAQI - European Environment Agency
 The UK Air Quality Archive
 North America:
 AQI at airnow.gov - cross-agency U.S. Government site
 New Mexico Air Quality and API data - Example of how New Mexico Environment Department publishes their Air Quality and API data.
 AQI at Meteorological Service of Canada
 San Francisco Bay Area Spare-the-Air - AQI explanation
 Asia:
 CAI at Airkorea.or.kr - website of South Korea Environmental Management Corp.
 API at JAS (Malaysian Department of Environment)
 Malaysia Air Pollution Index (inactive )
 API at Hong Kong - Environmental Protection Department of the Government of the Hong Kong Special Administrative Region (inactive )
 AQI in Thailand
 AQI in Vietnam
 AQI in Hanoi
 Unofficial PM25 AQI in Hanoi, Vietnam

 
Atmosphere of Earth
Air pollution
Environmental indices
Pollution